This is a list of airports in Martinique, sorted by location.

Martinique is an island in the eastern Caribbean.  It is an overseas department (DOM) of France.

ICAO location identifiers are linked to each airport's Aeronautical Information Publication (AIP), which are available online in Portable Document Format (PDF) from the French Service d'information aéronautique (SIA). Locations shown in bold are as per the airport's AIP page.



List

See also 

List of airports by ICAO code: T#Martinique''
List of airports in France
List of airports in the Caribbean
Transport in Martinique
Wikipedia: Airline destination lists: North America#Martinique (France)

References
French Civil Aviation sites
 Aeronautical Information Service / Service d'information aéronautique (SIA)
 Aeronautical Information Publications (AIP)
 Union des Aéroports Français

Notes

External links 
Lists of airports in Martinique:
Great Circle Mapper
Aircraft Charter World
The Airport Guide
World Aero Data
A-Z World Airports
FallingRain.com

 
Martinique-related lists
Martinique